Peculiar may refer to:

 Peculiar (album), an album by The Slackers
 Peculiar, a comic strip later published as a book, by cartoonist Richard Sala
 Royal peculiar, an ecclesiastical district, parish, chapel or church outside the jurisdiction of the bishop of the diocese in which it is situated

Places 
 Peculiar, Missouri
 Peculiar Township, Cass County, Missouri

See also 
Peculier (disambiguation)
 Peculiar galaxy
 Peculiar People